The Chaturdasha Temple is a Hindu temple (mandir) situated near Old Agartala, Tripura, India, and features the Tripuri dome patterned after the roofs of village huts in Tripura. The dome is surmounted by a stupa-like structure which reveals traces of Buddhist influence. This temple was built in honour of fourteen deities, together called the Chaturdasha Devata, by King Krishna Manikya of Tripura in 1761 and these deities are ceremoniously worshipped during Kharchi puja. The Tripuri names of the fourteen deities are Lampra, Akhata, Bikhata, Burasa, Thumnairok, Bonirok, Sangrongma, Mwtaikotor, Twima, Songatrama, Noksuma, Mailuma, Khuluma and Hachwkma.

See also

References

External links

Hindu temples in Tripura